The 11th Northwest Territories Legislative Assembly was the 18th assembly of the territorial government from 1987 to 1991.

By-elections
At least two by-elections occurred in this Assembly.

References

External links
Northwest Territories Legislative Assembly homepage

Northwest Territories Legislative Assemblies